Johannes Flum (born 14 December 1987) is a German former professional footballer who played as a midfielder.

Career
On 22 January 2011, Flum scored SC Freiburg's 500th goal in the Bundesliga.

Flum left FC St. Pauli upon the expiration of his contract in July 2020. After the club had signed new manager Timo Schultz, the club announced it would not offer Flum a new contract.

In August 2020 Flum returned to former club SC Freiburg to play for the club's reserves, thereby rejecting an offer from FC St. Pauli's local rivals Hamburger SV.

Career statistics

References

External links
 

1987 births
Living people
People from Waldshut-Tiengen
Sportspeople from Freiburg (region)
German footballers
Footballers from Baden-Württemberg
Association football midfielders
Germany youth international footballers
SC Pfullendorf players
SC Freiburg players
Eintracht Frankfurt players
FC St. Pauli players
SC Freiburg II players
Bundesliga players
2. Bundesliga players
3. Liga players
Regionalliga players